The 2021 Missouri Tigers football team represented the University of Missouri in the 2021 NCAA Division I FBS football season. The Tigers played their home games at Faurot Field in Columbia, Missouri, and competed in the Eastern Division of the Southeastern Conference (SEC). They were led by second-year head coach Eliah Drinkwitz.

Schedule

Game summaries

vs Central Michigan

at Florida

Sources:

vs Tennessee

vs North Texas

vs No. 21 Texas A&M

Statistics

at No.1 Georgia

vs Florida

at No.23 Arkansas

vs Army (Armed Forces Bowl)

Coaching staff

Players drafted into the NFL

References

Missouri
Missouri Tigers football seasons
Missouri Tigers football